St.-Pius-Gymnasium is a private Catholic Gymnasium (high school) located in Coesfeld near Münster, Germany. , the school had approximately 690 pupils.

It is named after Pope Pius X. The school is associated with the Lycée Notre-Dame in Guingamp, Brittany, France and a high school in Poole, Yorkshire, England.

The school has its own chapel and an auditorium. The whole school is a non-smoking area.

History
It was founded in 1953 by Bishop Michael Keller as an Internat (all-boys boarding school), in order to educate about 100 students for the priesthood. It had a fee of 100 Marks.

In April 1964 it was changed to a high school. In 1965 the school building at Gerlever Weg was built. Girls were admitted starting in 1969, and in the same year a building was erected for up to 300 students. In 1976 it became a Gymnasium. In 1979, the last of the boarding students left, and the following year a major expansion to the buildings was made.

See also 

 Education in Germany
 List of schools in Germany
 Catholic Church in Germany

References

External links
St.-Pius-Gymnasium homepage

Gymnasiums in Germany
Coesfeld
Educational institutions established in 1953
Catholic secondary schools in Germany
Schools in North Rhine-Westphalia
1953 establishments in West Germany